The Elephant Show (from the second season onward, Sharon, Lois & Bram's Elephant Show) is a Canadian preschool television show. The series premiered on CBC on October 8, 1984, and ended on February 26, 1989, after 65 episodes over five seasons.

Summary

The Elephant Show features the adventures of the Canadian singing trio Sharon, Lois & Bram and Elephant (Paula Gallivan in an elephant costume). Elephant doesn't speak but is voiced by a tuba (played by Scott Irvine), which conveys thoughts and mood by its pitch and inflection. The four are usually accompanied by a group of children and a sidekick, family entertainer Eric Nagler.

Every week Sharon, Lois & Bram, along with Eric Nagler, are joined by the curious and fun-loving antics of their pachyderm pal Elephant and such guest artists as Toller Cranston, Louis Del Grande, Jayne Eastwood, Murray McLauchlan, Chuck Mangione, Andrea Martin, The Nylons and Jan Rubeš.

Almost every episode contains a concert segment, featuring Sharon, Lois & Bram, Eric and the Mammoth Band. They sing songs and help children with their problems (including arguments, fear  and the failure of plans). In most episodes, the group travels to a new location (such as a hospital, museum or zoo). They occasionally stay home and have an adventure in their yard (like building a tree fort or encountering a grumpy neighbour). The show occasionally includes a social lesson (such as a pro UNICEF discussion). Sharon, Lois and Bram appeared in advertisements during the show's original run, encouraging parents to vaccinate their children against polio, mumps and rubella. Each episode concludes with the song "Skinnamarink", which was often performed twice.

The show enjoyed top ratings in Canada and had consistently been rated one of the top three programs on Nickelodeon in the United States. In 1993, a panel of experts at TV Guide rated The Elephant Show the #2 program for preschoolers, beating Sesame Street (#5) and Barney & Friends (#9). In the years following the final season, the show remained on Nickelodeon until they removed it from their lineup in 1994. By that time, The Elephant Show had aired 65 episodes in five seasons (plus the specials Live in Your Living Room and Back by Popular Demand, which compiled concert performances from the show with some new narration) and had been viewed in Australia, New Zealand, Canada, Great Britain, Greece, Hong Kong, Ireland, Japan, Malaysia, Singapore, South Africa and the United States, reaching over 100 million viewers. After the series ended, Eric Nagler starred in his own series, Eric's World, produced by The Elephant Show'''s producer, Cambium Productions.

Credits
 Directed by: George Bloomfield, Michael McNarama
 Produced by: Arnie Zipursky, Bruce Glawson
 Associate Producer & Production Manager: Charles Zamaria
 Concert Directed by: Stan Swan
 Music Directors: Joe Hampson, Ray Parker, Paul Mills
 Choreographers: Don Calderwood, Paula Gallivan
 Art Director: Susan Longmire
 Property Masters: Ray Lorenz
 Set Dresser: Ane Christensen
 On-Line Editor: Bob Doughty
 1st Camera: Simon Darylmple
 Lighting Director: Roger Bate
 Best Boy: Thomas Bate
 Key Grips: Cynthia Darlow
 Music Production Assistant: Randi Hampson
 Animation: Trickett Productions, Inc.
 Multi-Track Remote: Comfort Sound

Home video
The show has not been released on DVD in its original form as of yet, although there is a compilation video (along with Treetown) titled Nursery Rhymes and Bedtime Songs, which was also released as part of the Kids Learn to 6 Pack DVD under the name Stories, Rhymes and Lullabies''.

References

External links
 

1980s Canadian children's television series
1980s Canadian comedy television series
1980s Canadian music television series
1984 Canadian television series debuts
1989 Canadian television series endings
Canadian children's comedy television series
Canadian children's musical television series
Canadian preschool education television series
Canadian television shows featuring puppetry
1980s preschool education television series
CBC Television original programming
Television series about elephants
Television shows filmed in Toronto